André Santos may refer to:

 André Santos (fighter) (born 1981), Brazilian mixed martial artist
 André Santos (footballer, born 1975), Brazilian footballer
 André Luís Alves Santos (born 1972), Brazilian football forward
 André Santos (born 1983), Brazilian footballer
 André Alves dos Santos (born 1983), Brazilian footballer
 André Santos (footballer, born 1988), Portuguese footballer
 André Bahia dos Santos Viana (born 1983), Brazilian footballer
 André Santos (footballer, born 1989), Portuguese footballer

See also
 Santo André, São Paulo